Relativity is an album led by vibraphonist and composer Walt Dickerson which was recorded in 1962 and released on the New Jazz label.

Reception

The Allmusic reviewer stated: "If there is a flaw with Relativity, it's that it doesn't have quite the same spark of revelation as Dickerson's first two albums; critics were beginning to identify his brief note clusters and stop-start phrasing as stylistic trademarks, and aside from the duet with Abdul-Malik, the record doesn't really push Dickerson's sound into new territory. Still, taken independently of context, Relativity is another fine recording and one of the better pieces of Dickerson's underappreciated legacy". Down Beat reviewer Don DeMichael wrote: "This third Dickerson album, like the first two, offers excitement, emotional experience, and music of high quality. ...this is a very good album and is heartily recommended for the sometime electrifying emotion Dickerson is able to generate."

Track listing 
All compositions by Walt Dickerson except where noted
 "Relativity" - 5:20
 "It Ain't Necessarily So" (George Gershwin, Ira Gershwin) - 4:25 		
 "I Can't Get Started" (Vernon Duke, I. Gershwin) - 5:05
 "Steppin' Out" - 2:05
 "The Unknown" - 3:59
 "Sugar Lump" - 6:05
 "Autumn in New York" (Duke) - 7:25

Personnel 
Walt Dickerson - vibraphone
Austin Crowe – piano
Ahmed Abdul-Malik – bass
Andrew Cyrille – drums

References 

Walt Dickerson albums
1962 albums
Albums produced by Esmond Edwards
Albums recorded at Van Gelder Studio
New Jazz Records albums